The Art Museum of Antonio Paredes Candia (Museo de Arte Antonio Paredes Candia) is a museum in El Alto, Bolivia. It holds more than 500 works of art, and 11000 books.

References

See also 
 List of museums in Bolivia

Antonio Paredes Candia
Buildings and structures in La Paz Department (Bolivia)
Tourist attractions in La Paz Department (Bolivia)

es:Museo de Arte Antonio Paredes Candia